William Knight Boardman (February 3, 1915 – March 18, 1993) was a Republican Alaska legislator who served as Speaker of the Alaska House of Representatives from 1967 to 1968.

Born in Iowa, Boardman was a resident of Ketchikan, Alaska. An insurance businessman, he served as a member of the Territorial House of Representatives from the 1st District from 1953 to 1954, and as an Alaskan alternate delegate to the 1956 Republican National Convention.

In 1960, Boardman was elected to the Alaska House of Representatives and served in that office through the remainder of the decade. He was the senior member of the House at the time of his reelection defeat in 1970. From 1967 to 1968, he was the 4th Speaker of the Alaska House of Representatives. His predecessor, Democrat Mike Gravel, was a U.S. Senator from 1969 to 1981.

Boardman was a Methodist. Married three times, he had one daughter. He died in Palm Springs, California on March 18, 1993, and was buried in Evergreen Cemetery in Juneau, Alaska.

External links
 Entry in Political Graveyard
 Obituary in the New York Times
 William Boardman at 100 Years of Alaska's Legislature

1915 births
1993 deaths
20th-century American businesspeople
20th-century American politicians
American businesspeople in insurance
Businesspeople from Alaska
Drake University alumni
Insurance underwriters
Members of the Alaska Territorial Legislature
People from Ketchikan, Alaska
People from Nevada, Iowa
People from Palm Springs, California
Speakers of the Alaska House of Representatives
Republican Party members of the Alaska House of Representatives